205 Signal Squadron was a unit of the Royal Corps of Signals of the British Army. After two of their members were killed in an Army Air Corps Gazelle helicopter due to a friendly fire incident with HMS Cardiff during the Falklands War, the numbers "205" were painted at the crash site as a memorial.

References 

Squadrons of the Royal Corps of Signals